Sieciechowice may refer to:

Sieciechowice, Kraków County, a Polish village
Sieciechowice, Tarnów County, a Polish village